The Muhammad Ali Center is a non-profit museum and cultural center dedicated to boxer Muhammad Ali in Louisville, Kentucky. Ali, a native of Louisville, and his wife Lonnie Ali founded the museum in 2005. 

The six-story,  museum is located in the city's West Main District. It opened on November 19, 2005 at a cost of $80 million. It also includes a  two-level amphitheater and a plaza.

On April 4, 2013, a new pedestrian bridge opened, helping residents and visitors connect from the Muhammad Ali Center's plaza to the Belvedere, the Waterfront, and other downtown attractions. The 170-foot-long walkway is nine feet wide, with exterior metal panels that complement the Ali Center plaza's design.

History
In 2020, the Muhammad Ali Center in Louisville and the SEEK Museum in Russellville were added to the U.S. Civil Rights Trail.

Description
The cultural center features exhibitions regarding Ali's six core principles of confidence, conviction, dedication, giving, respect, and spirituality. Throughout his life, Muhammad Ali strived to be guided by these core principles in his quest to inspire people around the world, dedicating himself to helping others, being the best athlete he could be and by standing up for what he believed in.

An orientation theater helps present Ali's life.  A mock boxing ring is recreated based on his Deer Lake Training Camp. A two-level pavilion, housed within a large elliptical room, features Ali's boxing memorabilia and history. A large projector displays the film The Greatest onto a full-sized boxing ring. There are also booths where visitors can view clips of Ali's greatest fights on video-on-demand terminals, which also feature pre- and post-fight interviews.

Another exhibit offers visitors the chance to explore sense of self, others and purpose through an interactive terminal program. Visitors are encouraged to share what they are fighting for in the Generation Ali Story Booths 

Two art galleries, the LeRoy Neiman Gallery and the Howard L. Bingham Gallery, feature rotating exhibits that are located on the third floor.

Gallery

See also
List of attractions and events in the Louisville metropolitan area
List of museums focused on African Americans
List of museums in the Louisville metropolitan area

References

External links

 

2005 establishments in Kentucky
African-American museums in Kentucky
Ali, Muhammed
Boxing museums and halls of fame
Muhammad Ali
Museums established in 2005
Museums in Louisville, Kentucky
Personal development
Sports museums in Kentucky